Emamzadeh Ganju (also Romanized as Emāmzādeh Ganjū) is a village in Ahmadabad Rural District, in the Central District of Firuzabad County, Fars Province, Iran. At the 2006 census, its population was 41, in 6 families.

References 

Populated places in Firuzabad County